This page lists board and card games, wargames, miniatures games, and tabletop role-playing games published in 2020.  For video games, see 2020 in video gaming.

Games released or invented in 2020
Calico
Oceans
Tellstones: King's Gambit

Game awards given in 2020
 Barrage won the Spiel Portugal Jogo do Ano.

Significant games-related events in 2020

Deaths

See also
List of game manufacturers
2020 in video gaming

References

Games
Games by year